John May (15 April 1878 – 25 July 1933) was a Scottish footballer who played for Abercorn, Derby County, Rangers, Morton and Scotland.

Football career

Club
May played as a left half-back (comparable to a modern midfielder) and started his career at Bo'ness followed by Wishaw Thistle and Paisley club Abercorn, before signing for Derby County. Whilst there he played in two losing FA Cup finals (1899 and 1903). May made 179 league appearances for Derby, scoring 17 goals.

He joined Rangers in May 1904 and went on to play 148 times in the Scottish Football League and Scottish Cup, however, his spell at the club coincided almost exactly with a period when rivals Celtic were dominant, and May did not claim a winner's medal in either of the major competitions before he moved on to Morton in 1910.

International
May won five international caps for Scotland between 1906 and 1909.

Personal life
His younger brother Hugh was also a footballer who made a small number of appearances for both Rangers and Derby.

See also
 List of Scottish football families

References

1878 births
1933 deaths
Scotland international footballers
Rangers F.C. players
Derby County F.C. players
Greenock Morton F.C. players
Scottish footballers
Association football wing halves
English Football League players
Scottish Football League players
Scottish Football League representative players
Sportspeople from Shotts
Abercorn F.C. players
Wishaw Thistle F.C. players
Bo'ness F.C. players
FA Cup Final players
Footballers from North Lanarkshire